, in hiragana, or  in katakana, is one of the Japanese kana, each of which represents one mora. The hiragana is made in four strokes, while the katakana in one. Written with a dakuten (ぶ, ブ), they both represent a "bu" sound, and written with handakuten (ぷ, プ) they both represent a "pu" sound.

The katakana フ is frequently combined with other vowels to represent sounds in foreign words.  For example, the word "file" is written in Japanese as ファイル (fairu), with ファ representing a non-native sound, fa.

In certain Okinawan writing systems, ふ/フ can be written as ふぁ, ふぃ, ふぇ to make both fa, fi, and fe sounds as well as representing the sounds hwa, hwi, and hwe.  In the Ryukyu University system, fa/hwa is written using the wa kana instead, ふゎ/フヮ.  In the Ainu language the katakana with a handakuten プ can be written as a small ㇷ゚ to represent a final p sound. In the Sakhalin dialect, フ without a handakuten can be written as small ㇷ to represent a final h sound after an u sound (ウㇷ uh).

Stroke order

Other communicative representations

 Full Braille representation

 Computer encodings

References

Specific kana